Tommy Byrne may refer to:
Tommy Byrne (baseball) (1919–2007), Major League Baseball player
Tommy Byrne (musician) (born 1944), musician with the group Wolfe Tones
Tommy Byrne (racing driver) (born 1958), former Formula One racing driver

See also
Thomas Byrne (disambiguation)